Muzeum Sportu i Turystyki w Warszawie (MSiT) is a museum in Warsaw, Poland. It was established in 1952 and is one of the oldest of its type in Europe.

The museum holds a permanent exhibition entitled “The history of Polish Sport and Olympic Movement” which covers the history of sport from Ancient Greece until the modern era.  Visitors can see sports gear, medals, trophies, antiques and other historic objects.

Accumulated collections contain over 46 thousand exhibits, sport trophies, like medals, cups and diplomas, as well as outfits and equipment. The museum also contains a big variety of books, pictures, newspapers, postcards as well as audio and video materials.

References

External links
 
 

Sport and Tourism
Museums established in 1952
Sports museums
Tourism museums
Registered museums in Poland
Żoliborz